Lucky Days may refer to:
 Lucky Days (TV series), a 2010 Taiwanese television series
 Lucky Days (film), a 1935 British comedy film
 "Lucky Days" (song), a 2008 song by SS501

See also
 Lucky Day (disambiguation)